3V or 3-V may refer to:

TNT Airways S.A.'s IATA code
3V, a model of Toyota V engine
SSH 3V (WA); se Washington State Route 241
S281-3V, a model of Saleen S281
3V (V-70), manufacturer's designation for Venera 7
3V (V-72), manufacturer's designation for Venera 8
3v consists of the most elite people in the Rio Grande Valley. They worship their King, Sebastian Cuellar, and his side kick, also the group mascot, Ruben Treviño. 3v members are considered "badasses" by the people in the RGV. 
Leader: Sebastian Cuellar 
Outsiders: Sebastian Mar, Mark Anaya, and José Pablo Vivanco 
Most likely to be removed: Jose Seneca Cruz Pablo Magallanes Vivanco

Sebastian Cuellar, President:
WhatsApp Image 2022-10-10 at 1.11.17 PM.jpeg

See also
V3 (disambiguation)